MundoFox or Mundo Fox may refer to:
 mundofox.com, the former URL used by Fox Channel in Latin America
 Star+, an over-the-top video streaming service in Latin America formerly known as Mundo Fox and Fox Play
 MundoMax, a defunct Spanish language terrestrial television network in the United States known as MundoFox until 2015
 Nat Geo Kids (Latin American TV channel), a Latin American Spanish language television channel previously known as MundoFox from 2013 until 2017
 Mundo Fox (African TV channel), a television channel available in Portuguese-speaking African countries